Death of a Rockstar is the debut album by rock band Exit State. It was released on May 31, 2010 and features the singles "Bad Days" and "Lost Beyond Belief".

Track list 
All lyrics written by Roy Bright.  All songs written by Roy Bright, Adam Stephenson, Peat Hicks & Philip Ireland except:
Out till 3 - Roy Bright/Justin Beswick
Death of a Rockstar Part 2 - Roy Bright, Adam Stephenson, Peat Hicks & Eddie Sims
Bad Days - Roy Bright, Adam Stephenson, Peat Hicks & James Henderson
And She Said - Roy Bright, Adam Stepheson & Peat Hicks

Personnel
Exit State
Roy Bright – Vocals, Guitars
Adam Stephenson – Guitars
Philip Ireland – bass, backing vocals
Peat Hicks – Drums, backing vocals

Other contributors
Steve Fenton – Production and mixing
 Steve Gligorovic, Michael Gounelas & James Mottershead –  Studio Engineers
Roy Bright, Peat Hicks & Steve Fenton – Additional string arrangements
Laura Hurd & Jordan Molyneuax –  backing vocals
Ray Staff – Mastering
James Tunnacliffe – Cover Photography
Ash Goldie –  Individual item photographs
Mark Appleton – Management

Review References

2010 albums